The Sofia dialect is a Bulgarian dialect, member of the Southwestern Bulgarian dialects, which is spoken in western part of the Sofia valley by part of the Shopi. Its immediate neighbours are the Vratsa dialect to the north, the Elin Pelin dialect to the east, the Transitional dialects to the west and the Samokov dialect to the south.

Phonological and morphological characteristics
 Vowel  for Old Church Slavonic ѫ (yus), ь and ъ, as in Standard Bulgarian: мъж (man), сън (sleep). 
 Limited number of o reflexes of Old Church Slavonic ъ in the suffix -ък, the prefixes въз and съ and the prepositions във, въз and със: сос него vs. Standard Bulgarian със него (with him), напредок vs. Standard Bulgarian напредък (progress)
 щ/жд (~) for Proto-Slavic ~ (as in Standard Bulgarian) - леща, между (lentils, between). The future tense particle, however, is че: че че'теме vs. Standard Bulgarian ще четем
 ръ and лъ for Old Church Slavonic groups ръ/рь and лъ/ль versus formal Bulgarian ръ/ър (/) and лъ/ъл (/): дръво, слъза instead of formal Bulgarian дърво, сълза (tree, tear).
 Ending -м in verbs of all conjugations: че'тем vs. formal Bulgarian чет'ъ (I read)
 Lack of ending -т in the forms for 3rd person pl. present tense: яда vs. formal Bulgarian ядът (they eat)
 Personal pronouns for 3rd person он, она, оно, они (той, т҄а,  то, те in Standard Bulgarian)

For other phonological and morphological characteristics typical for all Southwestern dialects, cf. Southwestern Bulgarian dialects.

Sources
Стойков, Стойко: Българска диалектология, Акад. изд. "Проф. Марин Дринов", 2006

References 

Dialects of the Bulgarian language